Robert Damian Ellis (born 13 February 1962) is a producer, arranger, instrumentalist and composer. He is best known for his work with PJ Harvey, with whom he has been most closely associated as producer, arranger and musician since 1990.
His own compositional work, which could be described as being something akin to contemporary classical music, has been released on six recordings, three under the name Spleen and three under his own name: Music for the home (2000) and Music for the home - Volume 2 (2004) for The Leaf Label, and The Nostalgia Machine for KPM.

He has also worked as producer/arranger and musician for such artists as Marianne Faithfull, Robyn Hitchcock, ex-Ash guitarist Charlotte Hatherley, Madrugada, Laika, Swell, Placebo, ex-Tricky singer Martina Topley-Bird, Scott Walker and Ute Lemper, Cold Specks and most recently Anna Calvi, Bat for Lashes, Torres,
deux furieuses and The Blinders.

Discography

Solo
 Music for the Home (2000)
 Music for the Home - Volume 2 (2004)
 The Nostalgia Machine (2020)

With PJ Harvey
 Dry (1992)
 Rid of Me (1993)
 Is This Desire? (1998)
 Stories from the City, Stories from the Sea (2000)
 Uh Huh Her (2004)
 The Peel Sessions 1991–2004 (2006)

With Spleen
 Soundtrack to Spleen (1996)
 Little Scratches (1998)
 Nun Lover! (2006)

References

1962 births
Living people
English rock drummers
English multi-instrumentalists
British record producers
English record producers
Laika (band) members
Musicians from Bristol